Abercrombie House was built in Bathurst, New South Wales, Australia in the 1870s by the Stewart family who were Bathurst pioneers. William Stewart came to Australia from England in 1825 as part of the colonisation of the penal colony (Australia). William was the Lieutenant Governor General of New South Wales; which meant he was hypothetically 2nd in command to running Australia. William was given land in Bathurst as a reward for doing his job well. William Stewart's eldest son James built Abercrombie House. The house is considered to be of extreme historical significance. It is listed on the National Trust Register. It is also on the New South Wales Heritage Register and the Australian Heritage Database which describes it as "an outstanding example of Victorian Tudor style architecture. It is built of granite with sandstone dressing to the quoins and window surrounds, and there are two storeys together with an attic floor. The building's most striking feature is its array of curvilinear parapeted gables topped by iron finials." The  land and house is currently owned by the Rex Henry Morgan Family. Since 1969 the Morgan family has made major restorations to the house. The House is currently occupied by Christopher Morgan and his family.

The Stewart Family

James Horne Stewart, the son of William Stewart built Abercrombie House in about 1870. It was then called “The Mount” and took eight years to construct. A photo taken 15 years after its construction was included in an 1893 Brochure on Bathurst and is shown on the right. James lived there until his death in 1920 when he was 95 years of age.

James was born in 1825 in Edinburgh, Scotland. He came with his family to Australia at the age of ten in 1835. In 1855 he married at Toxteth Park in Sydney Harriet Eliza Boyce who was the daughter of the Rev. William Boyce, a very prominent clergyman. The couple had five children, three sons and two daughters.

Over the years James had many tenant farmers and several newspaper articles mentioned his kindness as a landlord. In times of drought he cut the rents by half so that the families did not endure undue hardship.

When James died in 1920 his son Athol took over the management of the property. Athol was born at Abercrombie House in 1867. He married Frances Helen McDougall (called Helen) in 1905. A photo of her is shown below in the gallery. On the death of his wife in 1927, Athol shut the house down and moved to Sydney. The house remained empty and gradually fell into decline until it was bought by the Morgan family.

The Morgan Family

The house was bought from James Stewart's great grandson in late 1968 by Rex Morgan AM, MBE, and Mary Morgan. Rex is a widely noted and three times nationally honoured educationalist.  A condition of the sale was that the name of the house be changed resulting in Morgans selection of ‘Abercrombie House’. This was a reference both to the shire of that name in which the property was situated and to General Sir Ralph Abercrombie, under whom William Stewart had served in the 1790s in the West Indies. The Morgans embarked on a complete restoration of the house and property. In 1969 they commenced a programme of public heritage tours of the house which has continued today.

The gates at Abercrombie House

The secondary gates at Abercrombie House are much older than the house which was built in 1870. They were brought from Toxteth Park in Sydney which is now St Scholastica's College. Toxteth Park was built in 1829 so this is the probable date of these gates. Toxteth Park was the home of Sir George Wigram Allen who was the brother in law of Harriet Stewart, the wife of James Horne Stewart. The house was sold in 1901 to the Good Samaritan Sisters and they wished to bring the gates from their old convent in Pitt St which was being demolished. The gates from Toxteth Park were no longer needed so they were transported to Abercrombie House.
In the early 1900s Arthur Wigram Allen who was Harriet's nephew visited his relatives at Abercrombie house. Arthur's mother Lady (Marian) Allen was Harriet's sister. Arthur photographed the gates mentioning that they were from Toxteth Park. See photograph on the right.

Abercrombie House in the Edwardian Era

Arthur Wigram Allen was a prominent lawyer in Sydney but he is most remembered for the numerous photographs he took which are today held by the NSW State Library. An exhibition of some of them called “An Edwardian Summer” was held in 2010-11 at the Sydney Museum and a link to this event is given here

When he visited his Aunt at Abercrombie House in this Edwardian era he took some photos of the property which are shown.

Further reading
The Claimant: a story of Australia, Scotland and England (2019, Harry Stewart, Canberra)  The Claimant: a story of Australia, Scotland and England.

References

External links
 Abercrombie House - official site

Bathurst, New South Wales
Historic house museums in New South Wales
New South Wales State Heritage Register